John Kelly (born November 1, 1984) is an amateur golfer who plays for the University of Missouri and was runner-up in the 2006 U.S. Amateur.

Kelly was born in St. Louis, Missouri and graduated from Christian Brothers College High School. 

During his run to the U.S. Amateur final, Kelly beat several nationally ranked players, including Trip Kuehne (who was runner-up to Tiger Woods in the 1994 U.S. Amateur).  He lost the final match to Scotland's Richie Ramsay on the 34th hole by a score of 4 and 2.  By making the finals, he qualified for the 2007 U.S. Open and gained an invitation to the 2007 Masters Tournament where he was the low amateur. Kelly also won the 2006 Missouri Stroke Play Championship, 2006 Metropolitan Match Play, 2006 & 2007 Ozark Invitational, 2005 Missouri Intercollegiate, 2004 Metropolitan Amateur, 2004 Phil Cotton Invitational and the 2003 AJGA Lockton Kansas City Junior.  He was the 2006 Missouri Golf Association Player of the Year.  Cleveland Golf and the Golf Coaches Association of America named him an All-America Scholar for both 2006 and 2007. He was an American Junior Golf Association (AJGA) All American-Honorable Mention in 2003.

Results in major championships

CUT = missed the half-way cut

References

External links
University of Missouri profile

American male golfers
Amateur golfers
Golfers from St. Louis
1984 births
Living people